Metteniusaceae are a family of flowering plants, the only family in the order Metteniusales. It consists of about 10 genera and 50 species of trees, shrubs, and lianas, primarily of the tropics. The family was formerly restricted to just Metteniusa, but it is now expanded with a number of genera that were formerly placed in the widely polyphyletic Icacinaceae.

Genera 
, the Angiosperm Phylogeny Website accepts 11 genera:
 Apodytes - c. 6 species
 Calatola - 7 species
 Dendrobangia - 3 species
 Emmotum - c. 10 species
 Metteniusa - 7 species
 Oecopetalum - 3 species
 Ottoschulzia - 3 species
 Pittosporopsis
 Platea - 8 species
 Poraqueiba - 3 species
 Rhaphiostylis - c. 10 species

References 

 
Asterid families